PT-34 may refer to:

 Motor Torpedo Boat PT-34, a U.S. Navy boat sunk in World War II
 PT-34, a Soviet mine roller based on the T-34 medium tank